Fredrik Waldemar Schauman  (10 August 1844, Helsinki – 16 September 1911, Helsinki) was a Finnish politician and lieutenant general. He was a member of the Senate of Finland. He was the father of Eugen Schauman.

1844 births
1911 deaths
Politicians from Helsinki
People from Uusimaa Province (Grand Duchy of Finland)
Swedish-speaking Finns
Finnish people of German descent
20th-century Finnish nobility
Finnish senators
Members of the Diet of Finland
Finnish generals
19th-century Finnish nobility